Abdullah Hassan Al-Noubi (Arabic:عبد الله حسن النوبي) (born 18 March 1995) is an Emirati footballer. He currently plays for Al-Arabi.

External links

References

Emirati footballers
1995 births
Living people
Place of birth missing (living people)
Al Ahli Club (Dubai) players
Hatta Club players
Fujairah FC players
Khor Fakkan Sports Club players
Al-Arabi SC (UAE) players
UAE Pro League players
UAE First Division League players
Association football defenders
Footballers at the 2018 Asian Games
Asian Games bronze medalists for the United Arab Emirates
Asian Games medalists in football
Medalists at the 2018 Asian Games